Systomus jayarami is a species of cyprinid fish native to Manipur, India.  This species reaches a length of  SL.

References 

Systomus
Fish described in 1986